Computer One is a science fiction novel of the near future by British novelist Warwick Collins, published in 1993. The novel charts the discovery by Professor Enzo Yakuda (the main protagonist) that the international civil network of computers known as "Computer One" will come to see humanity as a threat and move to eliminate it.

Plot summary
The novel describes a near utopia in which almost everything is automated by Computer One, with humanity's primary struggle being what to do with all its leisure time when there is very little work to be done.

Though analogous to the Internet, the Computer One of the novel assumes a far greater unity of purpose and truth. Whereas the content of sites on the World Wide Web varies greatly and typically reflects the views of individual authors, Computer One provides a single authoritative source of information with no ambiguity.

References in popular culture 
In 1983, Australian band Dear Enemy released a song titled "Computer One". The song questions the ability of Computer One to know and instruct where matters of love and human motive are concerned.

 Computer One by Warwick Collins on Goodreads

Sources

1993 British novels
1993 science fiction novels
British science fiction novels